The surname Trotsky, Trotskiy, or Trotski  is a toponymic surname derived from the Polish name Troki of the Lithuanian city of Trakai, literally meaning "of Troki" or "from Troki". It may be either the Russified form of the Polish noble name Trocki or a Jewish toponymic surname.

The surname may refer to:
Leon Trotsky (1879–1940), Bolshevik revolutionary and Marxist theorist.
 Noi Trotsky (1895-1940), Soviet architect
 Ivan Trotski (born 1976), Belarusian race walker

Russian-language surnames